Rodney Brand (born  1948) is a former American football center who lettered at University of Arkansas in 1967, 1968 and 1969. He was a member of the 1969 College Football All-America Team. He played in the 1969 and 1970 Sugar Bowl, winning the former, and in the 1970 Hula Bowl.

Following his college career, he was drafted by the New York Giants in the 14th round, 350th overall, in the 1970 NFL Draft, but never played a regular season game in the National Football League (NFL).

Brand was later named to the 1960's Razorbacks All-Decade Team and was inducted into the University of Arkansas Hall of Fame in 2014.

References

External links
Profile at Sports Reference

1940s births
Year of birth missing (living people)
Living people
American football centers
Arkansas Razorbacks football players
Players of American football from Arkansas
People from Newport, Arkansas